Keith Pollard (27 June 1946) is an English former professional rugby league footballer who played in the 1960s and 1970s, and coached in the 1970s through to the 2000s. As of December 2018, he is a member of the Hull Kingston Rovers Heritage Committee, which is part of the Hull Kingston Rovers Trust.

Background
Keith Pollard was born in Kingston upon Hull, East Riding of Yorkshire, England, he has worked as a mechanical estimator, he published his autobiography entitled "Red & White Phoenix - The Adventures Of A Hessle Road Lad" during December 2018, the net proceeds of which go to the Alpha 1-antitrypsin deficiency (A1AD) charity; Alpha-1 UK Support Group, his son Jason had previously died from A1AD, and as of January 2019 he lives in Kingston upon Hull.

Playing career
Keith Pollard signed for the Hull Kingston Rovers, during his time at Rovers he went on loan to York RLFC at the end of the 1965 / 6 season and played 6 first team games making his debut against Leeds RLFC at the end of that season he went back to Rovers. he was transferred from the Hull Kingston Rovers to Keighley, he made his début for Keighley against Bradford Northern on 30 September 1967, he played his last match for Keighley against Batley at Mount Pleasant, Batley on Saturday 27 February 1971, he relocated to Australia, he signed for the Maitland Pickers where he played alongside future rugby league coach; Peter Sharp, he joined the Maitland Pickers during the 1971 mid-season, he played two third-grade matches, then 14 straight first-grade matches; including first-grade semi-finals and the grand final, in the 1972 season he played 10 first-grade matches and 10 reserve-grade matches, plus reserve-grade semi-finals and grand final, in the 1973 season he played 18 first-grade matches, and 2 reserve-grade matches, plus first-grade semi-finals and grand final for a total of 21 first-grade matches, he signed for the Kempsey Kowboys where he played -matches as captain/player-coach, he played alongside John Mayew, during the 1975 season he played the full season, playing a total of 20-matches including the major semi-final and the grand final, during the 1976 season he missed 4-matches through injury, playing a total of 18-matches including the major semi-final and the grand final, he returned to the United Kingdom, he signed for Hull F.C., he transferred from Hull F.C. to Wakefield Trinity, he made his début for Wakefield Trinity during February 1977, he played his last match for Wakefield Trinity during the 1976–77 season, he was transferred from the Wakefield Trinity to Doncaster where he played one match against Keighley at Lawkholme Lane, Keighley during 1977.

Coaching career

References

External links
"Pollard" at rugbyleagueproject.org
Search for "Keith Pollard" at britishnewspaperarchive.co.uk

1946 births
Living people
Doncaster R.L.F.C. players
English rugby league coaches
English rugby league players
Hull Kingston Rovers players
Keighley Cougars players
Rugby league hookers
Rugby league props
Rugby league players from Kingston upon Hull
Wakefield Trinity players